Philippe Servaty is a Belgian journalist who formerly worked for Brussels-based newspaper Le Soir. While in Morocco from 2002 to 2005, he engaged in sex with over 80 Moroccan women, promising to take them to Belgium. Before leaving for Belgium, he asked them for sexual photos as souvenirs and photographed them in poses that could be seen as degrading. They included ejaculating on the face of a veiled woman and having another woman kneel, bound, and gagged while he urinated on her. After returning to Belgium, he published the photos on the internet under the pseudonym 'Belguel'.

At least one of the women filed a complaint to the police in Morocco, after a CD-ROM of the pictures began circulating in marketplaces in Agadir. The police arrested her, as well as many of the other women pictured, as posing for pornographic photos is a crime in Morocco. At least two of the women attempted suicide while in prison. Moroccan authorities asked Belgium to press charges against Servaty. Belgium declined, as the photos are not illegal under Belgian law. Moroccan authorities have stated that he will be arrested if he returns to Morocco; he had previously been arrested there for possession of pornography. Due to the scandal, Servaty resigned from Le Soir.

Families of the photographed women have placed a bounty on his head, and both he and his wife received death threats. Servaty was forced into hiding in fear for his life. Servaty said in an interview that he was a sex addict and apologized for his actions.

There were press reports at the time of the Moroccan scandal that Servaty, having been dismissed from Le Soir, was about to be taken onto the staff of the Brussels Regional Parliament as a civil servant, but that the offer had been abruptly withdrawn following his exposure in the media and the ensuing scandal. It is not known whether the offer was renewed once things had quietened down.

In February 2013, the Criminal Court of Brussels sentenced Servaty to 18 months for "debauchery or prostitution of a minor", "degrading treatment" and "exhibition and distribution of pornographic images".

References

Walloon people
Belgian journalists
Male journalists
Controversies in Belgium
Scandals in Belgium
Journalistic scandals
Sex scandals
Islam-related controversies
Living people
Year of birth missing (living people)